Sakuranin is a flavanone, a type of flavonoid. It is the O-glucoside of sakuranetin. It can be found in Prunus sp.

References

External links

O-methylated flavanones
Flavanone glycosides
Phenol glucosides